Michelangelo most often refers to the Tuscan Renaissance sculptor, architect, painter, and poet.

Michelangelo may also refer to:

 Michelangelo (given name)
 Michelangelo (Teenage Mutant Ninja Turtles), originally Michaelangelo
 3001 Michelangelo, asteroid named after the artist
 SS Michelangelo, an ocean liner named after the artist
 Michelangelo (computer virus)
 "Michelangelo" (song), by Björn Skifs
 "Michelangelo", a song by Emmylou Harris from her album Red Dirt Girl
 The Michelangelo, a hotel in New York
 Michelangelo (crater), an impact basin in the Michelangelo quadrangle of Mercury

See also
 Mike and Angelo, a British TV sitcom